The Cape Schanck Lighthouse was built in 1859 as the second coastal lighthouse in the Australian state of Victoria. It is located on Cape Schanck, at the southernmost tip of the Mornington Peninsula. Depending on the bearing of the light, the colours are either white (south to west sector) or red (east sector).

The lighthouse was not only one of the first such buildings in Victoria, it was moreover Australia's first lighthouse tower with stone stairs. During the 1970s and 1980s the facility was restored and has since become an attraction for tourists.  Today there is a museum in the old assistants' quarters.  Accommodation is available in the old residences of the lighthouse keeper.

See also

 List of lighthouses in Australia

References

External links

 Cape Schanck Lighthouse - official site

Lighthouses completed in 1859
Buildings and structures in the Shire of Mornington Peninsula
Lighthouses in Victoria (Australia)
1859 establishments in Australia
Maritime museums in Victoria (Australia)
Lighthouse museums in Australia
Heritage-listed buildings in Melbourne